Brian Mannix (born 7 October 1961 in Melbourne) is an Australian rock music singer and actor. He is best known as the lead singer of 1980s band Uncanny X-Men.

Career

Early life
Mannix won a 'beauty contest' in his childhood after being entered by a family friend, claiming the title Mr Ocean Grove 1971.

1981–1987: Uncanny X-Men
From 1981 to 1987, Mannix was the lead singer of 1980s band Uncanny X-Men. The band released two top twenty albums. Uncanny X-Men are known for their hits such as "The Party", "How Do You Get Your Kicks?", "50 Years" and "Everybody Wants to Work".

In 2006, Uncanny X-Men performed in the Countdown Spectacular and at the 2006 AFL Grand Final.

1988-present: solo career
Mannix was a regular on the ABC1 television quiz show Spicks and Specks where he usually played on Myf Warhurst's team. Mannix appeared as a contestant on Channel 7's series of Dancing with the Stars in its twelfth season during 2012 where he came fifth with professional dance partner Melanie Hooper.

In 2016, Mannix was cast as "Buddy," a leading role in the successful stage musical We Will Rock You based on the music of Queen and written by Ben Elton. The musical ran for six months from 30 April to 30 October 2016, first at Sydney's Lyric Theatre, followed by the Lyric Theatre at Brisbane's QPAC, and the Regent Theatre in Melbourne, where it closed with a spectacular performance on Sunday, 30 October 2016.

On Tuesday, 29 November 2016, Mannix announced he would be releasing a new single. The song, "Won't Be Home for Christmas" was co-written by Steve Harrison, a co-founder of the Uncanny X-Men, about "20 years ago" according to Mannix. It was released on 9 December 2016.

Brian Mannix has a show on Perth's Mix 94.5 every weekday from 12pm to 1pm called "Generation 80's".  Mannix tells the stories and Dean Claires plays the tunes.

Mannix lived in Airport West, Victoria until 2022 when he relocated to Queensland

Mannix is married to Susan Mannix (née Hebbard) and has two children, Casey and Max Mannix.

Film appearances and cameo roles
 Barry in the 1987 film The Bit Part
 Max/Lionel in the Australia TV series The Flying Doctors between 1986 and 1991
 Scum in the 1992 Australia TV mini series Good Vibrations. 
 Conor Cleary, a love interest for Lauren Carpenter in several episodes of Australian soap Neighbours in 1993
 David Emelyn Hughes in the Australia TV series Blue Heelers in 1995
 Ian James in the 2000 feature film Chopper
 Swinger in the Australian TV series Last Man Standing in 2008.
 Burt Pride in The Australian TV series Bogan Pride in 2010
 Guitar Man in the Australian TV series Offspring in 2010
  Mannix also appeared as himself in the 2010 Australian feature film Ricky! the movie.

Absolutely 80s tour and career revival
Mannix had more recent attention for his Absolutely 80's tour. Beginning in 2006, the tour plays at venues around Australia and features other popular eighties stars and bands such as Boom Crash Opera, Kids in the Kitchen, The Black Sorrows, The Choirboys and Wa Wa Nee. The Absolutely 80's concept has continued through 2018.

Mannix furthered his career revival by providing the vocals for an EDM song "F**K (Yeah!)" by DJ Paddy Duke.

Awards and nominations

Countdown Australian Music Awards
Countdown was an Australian pop music TV series on national broadcaster ABC-TV from 1974–1987, it presented music awards from 1979–1987, initially in conjunction with magazine TV Week. The TV Week / Countdown Awards were a combination of popular-voted and peer-voted awards.

|-
| 1985
| himself
| Most Popular Male Performer
| 
|-

References

External links

1961 births
20th-century Australian male singers
Australian rock singers
Musicians from Melbourne
The Apprentice Australia candidates
Living people